Pedro Miguel dos Santos Oliveira (born 18 August 1983 in Braga) is a Portuguese former professional footballer who played as a central defender.

References

External links

1983 births
Living people
Sportspeople from Braga
Portuguese footballers
Association football defenders
Primeira Liga players
Liga Portugal 2 players
Segunda Divisão players
S.C. Braga B players
S.C. Braga players
Gondomar S.C. players
G.D. Estoril Praia players
Moreirense F.C. players
F.C. Arouca players
G.D. Chaves players
F.C. Vizela players
Vilaverdense F.C. players
Cypriot First Division players
Ermis Aradippou FC players
Portuguese expatriate footballers
Expatriate footballers in Cyprus
Portuguese expatriate sportspeople in Cyprus